The city of Limpio (formerly known as Tapúa) is located in the Central Department, Paraguay. It was founded on February 2, 1785, by the Friar Luís de Bolaños under the name of San José de los Campos Limpios de Tapúa.

It was one of the first centers of Spanish–Guaraní crossbreeding. It is bordered by three rivers: The Paraguay River, the Salado River and the San Francisco River. Its saint patron is Saint Joseph.

Characteristics

This city is considered to be one of the first towns in the country.

It has an approximate area of  shared in 9 companies and 20 urban neighborhoods and villas. Some of them still have a purely agricultural-rural character, while others are more urbanized.

To get there you should take the Route 3 "General Elizardo Aquino". Because of the explosive growth rate and its high population density, as well as a lack of infrastructure, it is a challenge for its inhabitants to develop opportunities.

The city has a port over the Paraguay River named "Piquete Cué" that in its early times enabled commercial activities for the local industries. This district is an immigration center because of the nearness to Asunción and its infrastructure.

History

Although the reference to its origin is related to the era of the Spanish conquest, the history of Limpio does not have any chronological story.

For clearing out the data of its origin we have to go back in the time that the Captain of Vergara, Domingo Martínez de Irala, came to the region in 1537 and started the crossbreeding marrying himself with the daughter of the Chief Mkirase, Yvoty Sa'yju (later renamed as Leonor), and acquired "carte blanche" among the natives. This title was later self-attributed by Mariano Roque Alonso.

It maintains a privileged geographical position, bordered by ample and fertile valleys surrounding the Campos Limpios de Tapu'a (Clean Fields of Tapu'a). Because of that, for a long time this place was named San José de los Campos Limpios, but the name was later shortened to Limpio.

Demography

Limpio has 87,301 inhabitants, of which 43,945 are male and 43,355 are female, according to the General Direction of Statistics, Polls and Census.

About 37% of its population is urban and 27% is rural. The rate of demographic growth is high – 8.24% annually in the last year. The city experienced high rates of population growth as a result of the new pavement of Route 3 and the development of social urban programs.

Tourism

Among the places that could be visited in Limpio are: the picturesque El Peñón in the Paraguay river, the San Francisco Isle, the old San José Church, the few colonial houses still standing and the famous Piquete Cué port, once one of the most important ports and where the initial trace of the Trans-Chaco Route used to pass.

The elders say that the church in Limpio is over 400 years old, including the altarpieces that amaze with their colorful and exquisite design. Its facade is likely from the time of Carlos Antonio López, who frequented that zone when the Surubi'y stanza (the first of the De la Plata River) was property of his daughter, Inocencia López. Nowadays, the yard of the church displays beautiful vegetation and in the middle of it can be seen the grandiose first ecological sanctuary of the country. Also, the San Francisco Isle, with 15 kilometers long by 6 kilometers wide is considered as an ecological reserve.

Art and culture

The craftsmanship of Limpio is based on the basketmaking and hats made of karanday. It also has the ballets "Karanday Poty" and "Ballet Mainumby". The celebrations honoring Saint Joseph, the saint patron of the city, form a part of the city's culture. Limpio also boasts the fountain of the first ecological sanctuary of the country. Many people gather in this place to refresh themselves with these waters which, according to the popular beliefs, are sacred.

Outstanding citizens

 Benigno Ferreira, former President of Paraguay (1906–1908)
 Agustín Bogarín Argaña, Parish Priest of the Encarnación.
 Fernando de la Mora, important personage of the Paraguayan independence.

Economy

The artisan hats of karanday, made in Limpio, are the main activity that the people in Limpio are known for. They also make bags, wide painted hats and other articles out of karanday (palm leaves).

Agricultural and cattle production is developed in farms, with cultivation of green vegetables and fruits and also production of milk and its derivative products.

Climate

The maximum temperature in Limpio is in summer, reaching the 40 °C, which could be higher sometimes. The minimum temperature in winter is 4 °C. The annual average is  23 °C.

Precipitation is about  annually. The rains are more frequent between January and April, and more scarce between June and August.

Neighborhoods and districts

Limpio has more than 20 companies (districts) such as Isla Aranda, Salado, Isla Aveiro, Kure Ygua, among others. Some of the neighborhoods are: Villa Jardín, Anahí and Santa Mónica.

References

 Reportaje al País. Tomo 2. Año 2001.

External links
 Midamos
 Viajes a
SENATUR
World Gazeteer: Paraguay – World-Gazetteer.com

Populated places in the Central Department
Populated places established in 1785